Capys brunneus is a butterfly in the family Lycaenidae. It is found in Tanzania, Malawi and Zambia.

Subspecies
Capys brunneus brunneus (southern and western Tanzania, Malawi)
Capys brunneus heathi Henning & Henning, 1988 (Zambia)

References

Butterflies described in 1916
Capys (butterfly)
Butterflies of Africa
Taxa named by Per Olof Christopher Aurivillius